Prémontré is a commune in the Aisne department in Hauts-de-France in northern France.

Population

Sights
The remains of Prémontré Abbey, the mother house of the Premonstratensian Order, are located in Prémontré.

See also
 Communes of the Aisne department

References

Communes of Aisne
Aisne communes articles needing translation from French Wikipedia